A Descriptive Vocabulary of the Language in Common Use Amongst the Aborigines of Western Australia is a book by George Fletcher Moore. First published in 1842, it represents one of the earliest attempts to record the languages used by the Aboriginal peoples of Western Australia. The book is a compilation by Moore based on the works of Robert Lyon, Francis Armstrong, Charles Symmons, the Bussell family and George Grey, as well as his own observations. It was published in 1842 at the expense of Moore and Governor of Western Australia John Hutt. In 1884 it was republished as part of Moore's Diary of Ten Years Eventful Life of an Early Settler in Western Australia and also A Descriptive Vocabulary of the Language of the Aborigines.

The work is a key source in records of the nomenclature of Australia's Southwest flora and fauna. The compilation of regional variants in the Nyungar language is cited in Serventy and Whittell Birds of Western Australia and subsequent ornithological literature, although his own observations of bird-life remained unpublished until the 1884 edition of Moore's diary.

References

 Moore, George Fletcher (1884). Diary of Ten Years Eventful Life of an Early Settler in Western Australia, and also A Descriptive Vocabulary of the Language of the Aborigines. First published by M. Walbrook, London. Facsimile edition published in 1978 by Nedlands, Western Australia: University of Western Australia Press.
 Stannage, C. T. (1978). Introduction to Facsimile edition of Moore (1884).

External links
 

1842 non-fiction books
Books about Western Australia
History of Indigenous Australians
History of Western Australia
Books about Indigenous Australians